Victor Florescu (born 5 October 1973) is a Moldovan judoka in the -90 kg category. He was at the 2000 Summer Olympics where he was defeated by Jean-Claude Raphael and won a silver medal at the 1999 World Judo Championships. He obtained the best result for Moldova at the world championships in judo to date.

Achievements

References

1973 births
Living people
Moldovan male judoka
Judoka at the 2000 Summer Olympics
Olympic judoka of Moldova
20th-century Moldovan people
21st-century Moldovan people